The Shelby Reds, was the primary name of a minor league baseball team that played in Shelby, North Carolina, between 1937 and 1982.

The Reds were a member of the Western Carolinas League, before transferring with the league to the South Atlantic League in 1980. The club was initially affiliated with the Cincinnati Reds. In 1979, the Pittsburgh Pirates became their affiliate, changing the team's name to the Shelby Pirates. The team changed affiliates again in 1981, this time to the New York Mets. As result their name changed a final time to the Shelby Mets. Among earlier teams were the Shelby Colonels, Shelby Farmers, Shelby Yankees, Shelby Rebels, Shelby Senators and Shelby Cubs.

Notable Shelby alumni

 Rafael Belliard (1980)

 Bruce Berenyi (1977)

 Mike Bielecki (1980)

 George Brunet (1953)

 Mark Carreon (1982)

 Dave Coble (1948 & 1951–1952, MGR)

 Jose DeLeon (1980)

 Lenny Dykstra (1981-1982) 3 x MLB All-Star

 Wes Ferrell (1965, MGR) 2 x MLB All-Star

 Cecilio Guante (1980)

 Paul Householder (1977)

 Hal Jeffcoat (1946)

 Roger McDowell (1982)

 Eddie Milner (1977)

 Fritz Peterson (1964)

 Roy Smalley Jr. (1946)

 Gene Tenace (1965) MLB All-Star; 1974 World Series Most Valuable Player

 John Wockenfuss (1969)

Season-by-season

Source:

References

Baseball teams established in 1977
Baseball teams established in 1982
Defunct Western Carolinas League teams
Defunct South Atlantic League teams
Cincinnati Reds minor league affiliates
New York Mets minor league affiliates
Pittsburgh Pirates minor league affiliates
Professional baseball teams in North Carolina
Defunct baseball teams in North Carolina
Baseball teams disestablished in 1982